Muneo Suzuki (鈴木 宗男 Suzuki Muneo, born 31 January 1948), commonly known simply as "Muneo" due to his common last name, is a Japanese Russophilic politician from Ashoro, Hokkaidō, currently serving as a member of the House of Councillors since 2019, representing the National PR block.

Early career 
He graduated from the Department of Political Science at Takushoku University in 1970, and before he graduated he began working for Ichirō Nakagawa, a Japanese member of the House of Representatives. Nakagawa committed suicide in a hotel in January 1983 for unknown reasons. Suzuki hoped to run for his seat, but Ichirō's son Shōichi Nakagawa, a Tokyo native, moved to Hokkaidō to run for his father's seat, and Suzuki successfully ran for a seat in a neighboring district. He was elected in December 1983 as a member of the Liberal Democratic Party (LDP).

He was appointed Head of the Hokkaido Development Agency and the Okinawa Development Agency in 1997 and later as Vice Minister of the Cabinet of Prime Minister Keizō Obuchi.

Scandal and criminal convictions 
In 1999, while Suzuki was the Deputy Chief Cabinet Secretary to the former Prime Minister Obuchi, he pressured the Foreign Ministry to fund the Japanese-Russia Friendship House (nicknamed the "Muneo House"), which became a scandal in 2002 when it was revealed.

He left the LDP in 2002 and was arrested later that year for suspicion of accepting bribes from two Hokkaidō companies. He did not run for reelection in the 2003 elections on the stated grounds that he was undergoing surgery to treat stomach cancer. His secretary Akira Miyano was convicted of bribery in 2003, and Muneo was convicted of taking the bribes, failure to declare political donations, and perjury and sentenced to two years in prison and fined ¥11 million in November 2004.  He remained free and in office as he appealed the conviction.

Muneo ran for the House of Councillors in 2004. He was defeated, but ran successfully for the House of Representatives of Japan in the 11 September 2005 elections after forming the New Party Daichi. He is the only elected member of the party.

On 7 September 2010, the Supreme Court of Japan unanimously upheld Suzuki's conviction and sentence.  In response, Suzuki stated that he would file a complaint against the ruling.  If the complaint is rejected, Suzuki will be removed from office and the fine and prison sentence will take effect.  He would also be banned from running for public office for five years after completion of the prison sentence. Suzuki was paroled on 6 December 2011 after serving one year of prison in Tochigi Prefecture.

Later career 
His ban from running from public office expired on 30 April 2017, allowing him to run again for election. He ran in the 2017 general election as the head of the NPD list for the Hokkaido PR block but was not elected. He ran again in the 2019 House of Councillors election on the National PR list for the Nippon Ishin no Kai. He won the most votes on the party's list, and was thus elected for the first time since being removed from office in 2010.

Political positions 
 He is in favour of constitutional amendment, legalisation of same-sex marriage and introduction of surname system for married couples.
 As an elected member of the Hokkaido Assembly, he has been advocating for the rights of the Ainu people.

References 

1948 births
Living people
Japanese politicians convicted of corruption
Japanese prisoners and detainees
Japan–Russia relations
Liberal Democratic Party (Japan) politicians
Members of the House of Representatives (Japan)
People convicted of bribery
Perjurers
Prisoners and detainees of Japan
Takushoku University alumni
21st-century Japanese politicians
Politicians from Hokkaido
Russophilia